The Jicarilla Apache Historic District in Dulce, New Mexico is an  historic district which was listed on the National Register of Historic Places in 1984.

It includes 30 contributing buildings and three contributing sites.

It includes Main St., NM 17, Apache, Keliiaa, and Sand Hill Drs.

References

Historic districts on the National Register of Historic Places in New Mexico
National Register of Historic Places in Rio Arriba County, New Mexico
Buildings and structures completed in 1887
1887 establishments in New Mexico Territory
Historic District